The 1998 Little League World Series took place from August 23–29 in Williamsport, Pennsylvania. Toms River, New Jersey, defeated Kashima, Ibaraki, Japan in the championship game of the 52nd Little League World Series. The title game was punctuated by a standout performance by future MLB Home Run Derby champion Todd Frazier, who went 4-for-4 with a lead-off home run, and was also the winning pitcher. Rain plagued this LLWS, pushing out sponsors making the 1998 Honda pin one of the most rare as they left after only 3 days at the series.

Teams

Pool play

Standings

Results

Elimination round

Notable players
Todd Frazier (Toms River, New Jersey) was drafted 34th overall by the Cincinnati Reds in the 2007 MLB Draft and played in 11 MLB seasons as an infielder for the Reds, Chicago White Sox, New York Yankees, New York Mets, Texas Rangers and Pittsburgh Pirates. 2015 Home Run Derby champion, 2-time All-Star (2014 and 2015) and 2020 Olympic silver medalist.
Jordan Lennerton (Langley, British Columbia) played first base in the Detroit Tigers and Atlanta Braves organizations. Won the CWS title with Oregon State in 2007.

Champions Path
The Toms River East American LL lost five games before reaching the LLWS, losing once each in district, section, and state tournaments and twice in the East Region tournament.

References

Further reading

External links
1998 official results via Wayback Machine
1998 teams and rosters

Little League World Series
Little League World Series
Little League World Series
Little League World Series